Blackbourn was a hundred of Suffolk, consisting of .

Blackbourn hundred was situated in the north-west of Suffolk. Its northern boundary is the Little Ouse forming the border with Norfolk, and the River Lark forms part of its western boundary.

The hundred appears in the Domesday Book as Blachruna and Blackebrune meaning "black bourn", where a bourn is a stream. The stream in question is that which flows north through Ixworth, Bardwell, and Fakenham Magna to the Little Ouse at Euston and is still known as the Black Bourn.

Parishes

Blackbourn Hundred consisted of the following 34 parishes:

References

Hundreds of Suffolk
Blackbourn Hundred